Richard Arnold Dümmer (1887 in Cape Town – 2 December 1922, in Uganda) was a South African botanist who collected in South Africa, Kenya and Uganda. 

Dümmer worked in the Cape Town municipal gardens before joining Kew as a gardener in 1910. In 1911 he became assistant to Prof. Augustine Henry and had a hand in preparing Elwes and Henry's "The Trees of Great Britain and Ireland" for publication. Dümmer worked in the herbaria and libraries of Kew, the British Museum, the Linnaean Society, Cambridge, Oxford and Edinburgh Universities. He published taxonomic notes on Agathosma, Eugenia, Bruniaceae, Alepidea, Lotononis, Pleiospora, Combretaceae, Adenandra and Acmadenia.

He was employed by the Kivuvu Rubber Company of Kampala in 1914, using the opportunity to collect flowering plants and fungi. He also arranged botanical expeditions to Mount Elgon and Mount Longonot crater. Dümmer then spent a year back in Cape Town identifying and processing his collections. 

His life and career were cut short by a motor-cycle accident on the Jinji road in Kampala. He is commemorated by the Kew Guild's annual award of "The Dümmer Memorial Prize" to the student submitting the best collection of British plants. His specimens number over 20 000 and are housed at PRE, SAM, NH, BM, E, K, MO, P and US.

References 

 

1887 births
1922 deaths
Employees of the British Museum
Scientists from Cape Town
20th-century South African botanists
South African expatriates in Uganda